Gangotri Bhandari (born 13 August 1956 in Garhwal) is a former player for the Indian Women's Hockey Team. She represented India at the 1980 Summer Olympics and 1982 Asian Games along with many other international tournaments. She has also been the wise captain for Indian Women's Hockey Team during the Asian Hockey Championship in Kyoto, Japan in 1981. She is currently living with her family and working for NWR Railways as chief office superintendent in its Jaipur division.

Personal life
Gangotri Bhandari was born at Pauri Garhwal. She is the first daughter, and has two siblings. She shifted to Jaipur in 1966 and started playing field hockey as a hobby during her schooling and later played for India at national and international levels.

Career

National tournaments

International tournaments

Achievements 

Gangotri Bhandari played for the Indian Women's Hockey Team in 1980 MOSCOW Olympics where the team stood 4th position.

She has also played 2nd World Hockey Championship at Vancouver, Canada in 1979 and World Cup at Kuala Lumpur, Malaysia in 1983.

Gold Medals

Awards

External links

Medal Winners (Asian Games)

1956 births
Field hockey players from Jaipur
Rajasthani people
Living people
Olympic field hockey players of India
Field hockey players at the 1980 Summer Olympics
Indian female field hockey players
Sportswomen from Rajasthan
20th-century Indian women
20th-century Indian people
Asian Games medalists in field hockey
Field hockey players at the 1982 Asian Games
Asian Games gold medalists for India
Medalists at the 1982 Asian Games